Edson De Sousa Samms Record (born 27 March 1995) is a Panamanian professional footballer who plays as winger.

Playing career
Samms made his professional debut with Deportivo Lara in a 0-0 Venezuelan Primera División tie with Trujillanos F.C. on 7 February 2020.

International career
Samms made his debut for the Panama national team in a 3-0 friendly loss to the United States on 29 January 2019.

References

External links
 
 NFT Profile

1995 births
Living people
People from Bocas del Toro Province
Panamanian footballers
Panama international footballers
Panama youth international footballers
Association football wingers
San Francisco F.C. players
C.D. Árabe Unido players
Atlético Veragüense players
Costa del Este F.C. players
Asociación Civil Deportivo Lara players
Liga Panameña de Fútbol players
Venezuelan Primera División players
Panamanian expatriate footballers
Panamanian expatriate sportspeople in Venezuela
Expatriate footballers in Venezuela
2015 CONCACAF U-20 Championship players